Dorhale is a village in Rahata taluka of Ahmednagar district in the Indian state of Maharashtra.

Population
As per 2011 census, population of village is 2694, of which 1380 are males and 1314 are females.

Transport

Road
Dorhale is connected to nearby villages Pohegaon and Korhale by village roads.

Rail
Shirdi Railway Station is nearest railway station to a village.

Air
Shirdi Airport is the nearest airport to a village.

See also
List of villages in Rahata taluka

References 

Villages in Ahmednagar district